Tiller is an unincorporated community in Douglas County, Oregon, United States. It is located on Oregon Route 227 and the South Umpqua River, in the Umpqua National Forest.

Tiller was named for Aaron Tiller, who settled in the locality. Tiller post office was established in 1902.

Tiller is ZIP Code 97484 in Area Code 541, although parts of the town are included in the zip code of neighboring Days Creek. Tiller is served by the 825 exchange. 

In 2017, many of the town's properties were offered for sale for $3.85 million. The asking price included 257 contiguous acres encompassing most of the town's buildings as well as wooded hilltops and approximately 2 million board feet of marketable lumber. The sale did not include the community church, pastor's residence, fire station, and several other properties. After a year of negotiation, a Garden Grove, California-based company called Global Shopping Mall signed the deed in September 2018.  On August 17, 2021, Tiller Town Corporation was incorporated as an Oregon corporation, although the owner's development plans remained unannounced.  

In October 2022, local residents quoted in The Oregonian described Global Shopping Mall as "absentee business owners" and complained that blackberry vines were overtaking the abandoned buildings, causing a potential fire hazard.

References

1902 establishments in Oregon
Populated places established in 1902
Unincorporated communities in Douglas County, Oregon
Unincorporated communities in Oregon